Living in America is the debut album in English by Swedish new wave band The Sounds, produced in 2002 under the Warner Sweden record label. The International Federation of the Phonographic Industry awarded the album a platinum certification in 2003, denoting sales in excess of 40,000 copies.

The album received mixed to positive reviews, AllMusic writer Andy Kellman gave it 3/5 stars and wrote "But the thing you cannot take away from the members of this Swedish group is that they know how to write and play songs". The album spawned five singles; the second single, "Living in America", reached #3 on the Swedish single.

Track listing

Original Swedish version

American version
The American version was released on 6 May 2003. It featured a different song order, alternate artwork and the hidden bonus track "S.O.U.N.D.S".

Charts

Weekly charts

Year-end charts

References

2002 debut albums
The Sounds albums
New Line Records albums